Denmark was represented by Ulla Pia, with the song "Stop – mens legen er go'", at the 1966 Eurovision Song Contest, which took place on 5 March in Luxembourg City. "Stop – mens legen er go'" was chosen as the Danish entry at the Dansk Melodi Grand Prix on 6 February.

Danish broadcaster DR withdrew from Eurovision following the 1966 contest, and would not return to the fold until 1978. The reasons for the withdrawal are unclear, although it is believed that a new programme controller at DR did not consider the expense involved in Eurovision participation to represent value for money.

Before Eurovision

Dansk Melodi Grand Prix 1966 
The DMGP was held at the Tivoli in Copenhagen, hosted by Annette Faaborg. Six songs took part, with the winner chosen by voting from seven regional juries. Former Danish representatives Gustav Winckler (1957) and Dario Campeotto (1961) were among the participants, although they ended up sharing last place.

At Eurovision
On the night of the final Ulla Pia performed second in the running order, following Germany and preceding Belgium. "Stop – mens legen er go'" had a contemporary sound and featured an instrumental break during which two dancers performed an energetic routine. Each national jury awarded 5-3-1 to their top three songs, and at the close "Stop – mens legen er go'" had received 4 points (3 from Finland and 1 from Norway), placing Denmark 14th of the 18 entries. The Danish jury awarded its 5 points to Sweden, one of many instances of neighbourly voting in the first contest in which this phenomenon was really remarked on by observers.

Voting

References 

1966
Countries in the Eurovision Song Contest 1966
Eurovision